The Rising were a professional wrestling stable in Total Nonstop Action Wrestling (TNA), which consisted of Drew Galloway, Eli Drake and Micah.

History 
On January 29, 2015, Drew Galloway made his debut for Total Nonstop Action Wrestling (TNA) during the tapings of Impact Wrestling in Glasgow, Scotland, coming to the aid of TNA British Boot Camp season 2 competitor Grado and entering a feud with The Beat Down Clan. The following night, Galloway competed in his first official match for TNA, answering The Beat Down Clan's challenge, he defeated Kenny King in Manchester. On January 31, in London, Galloway defeated MVP by disqualification, after the Beat Down Clan interfered in the match. On the April 10 episode of Impact Wrestling, Galloway formed "The Rising" stable with Eli Drake and Micah. On the April 10 episode of Impact Wrestling, The Rising defeated The BDC by DQ when a masked man (Homicide) ran out and attacked Galloway. Later that same night, after a match between Micah and Kenny King ended, Galloway and the members of The Rising came to help only to be beaten down. Afterwards Galloway challenged Low Ki to a Steel Pipe on a Pole match at Hardcore Justice, which Galloway won. On the June 3 edition of Impact Wrestling, The Rising defeated The BDC.

On the July 1, 2015 episode of Impact Wrestling, The Rising was defeated by The Beat Down Clan in a 4-on-3 Handicap match, forcing The Rising to dissolve.

References 

Impact Wrestling teams and stables